George Henry  (1858–1943) was a Scottish painter, one of the most prominent of the Glasgow School.

Life
Henry was born in Irvine, North Ayrshire, and studied at the Glasgow School of Art, later in Macgregor's studio, but learned most from his nature studies at Kirkcudbright. His father's name was Hendry and George dropped the "d" from his surname as a young man.

He was influenced also by his collaboration with E. A. Hornel in such works as "The Druids" (1887), Grosvenor Gallery, London.  His "Galloway Landscape" was epoch-making at Glasgow by reason of its higher key of colour and essentially decorative character.  Following these tendencies, the two friends spent a year and a half in Japan.

Henry's importance consists in his influence in the Glasgow school in the direction of richer and more decorative color. In addition to genre and landscape, he also painted portraits, more distinguished by technical ability than by rendition of character. Henry's pictures in public collections include "The Blue Gown," Museum of Cape Town, "The Gray Hat," at Edinburgh, two portraits at Glasgow, and one at Montreal. He was elected a member of the Royal Scottish Academy (1902) and an associate of the Royal Academy.

"The Black Hat", a luminous portrait of a supremely confident Edwardian woman, was included in Modern Britain, a 2007 exhibition at Melbourne's National Gallery of Victoria.

In 1893 he went to Japan with Edward Atkinson Hornel another of the Glasgow Boys for an 18-month study tour. His work thereafter continued to have a strong Oriental flavour.

Publications
 Martin, The Glasgow School of Painting (London, 1897)
 Caw, Scottish Painting, Past and Present (Edinburgh, 1908)

References

External links

 
Gazetteer for Scotland
George Henry's biography & artwork from the Permanent Collection of the Gracefield Arts Centre in Dumfries, Scotland biography & virtual representation of George Henry's artwork of Gracefield Arts Centre at exploreart.co.uk
 Profile on Royal Academy of Arts Collections

19th-century Scottish painters
Scottish male painters
20th-century Scottish painters
Royal Academicians
1858 births
1943 deaths
People from Irvine, North Ayrshire
Glasgow School
Alumni of the Glasgow School of Art
Royal Scottish Academicians
19th-century Scottish male artists
20th-century Scottish male artists